Zamarada is a genus of moths in the family Geometridae, first described by Frederic Moore in 1887. The species type is Zamarada translucida. Over 250 species and 35 subspecies (including nominates) have been listed.

Description
Moths in this genus have short, porrect palpi and roughly scaled with bipectinate (comb like on both sides) antennae that present with longer branches in male than female moths. Their hind tibia are not dilated. Forewings with vein 3 from angle of cell. Veins 7 to 9 stalked from upper angle and vein 10 absent. Vein 11 free. Hindwings with vein 3 from angle of cell.

Selected species
 Zamarada aureomarginata
 Zamarada baliata (Felder & Rogenhofer, 1875)
 Zamarada denticulata D. S. Fletcher, 1974
 Zamarada differens
 Zamarada eogenaria (Snellen, 1881)
 Zamarada eucharis
 Zamarada exigua
 Zamarada metallicata Warren, 1914
 Zamarada nesiotica D. S. Fletcher, 1974
 Zamarada scriptifasciata (Walker, 1862)
 Zamarada ucatoides Holloway

Notes

External links

Abraxini